Jacques Decour (born Daniel Decourdemanche; 21 February 1910, in Paris – 30 May 1942, in Fort Mont-Valérien), was a French writer, Germanist, essayist, translator and resistant fighter, killed by the Nazis.

Biography
Jacques Decour studied at the Lycée Carnot in Paris and the Lycée Pasteur in Neuilly-sur-Seine. He began his studies in law, but, after a few years changed his orientation and studied German literature and obtained his degree in this topic.

In 1932, he was named assistant of French in Prussia at a school in Magdeburg. There, he wrote his first book, Philisterburg, which described the risks of nationalism and the "inadmissible myth of race". This book went unnoticed, and French public opinion did not take account of the menacing signs coming from Germany.

He then was appointed as a teacher of German in Reims where he joined the French young Communist movement. He was then moved to Tours where he joined the Communist Party.

In 1937, he was appointed as professor of German in Paris at the lycée Rollin (the school which, after Liberation, would become the lycée Jacques-Decour in his honour). He joined the resistance and founded the magazines L'université libre in 1940 and La Pensée libre in 1941 which became important publications in occupied France.

In 1941, Decour became responsible for the Comité national des écrivains which published a new magazine the Lettres françaises but never got to see it, due to his arrest by the French police on 17 February 1942. Imprisoned in La Santé by the Germans, he was executed on 30 May 1942, one week after Georges Politzer and Jacques Solomon. In the cell where he was waiting for his execution in Fort Mont-Valérien, he wrote a letter saying goodbye to those he loved. Resigned to his forthcoming death, he expressed his confidence in youth, and hoped that his sacrifice would not be in vain.

"Je me considère un peu comme une feuille qui tombe de l’arbre pour faire du terreau. La qualité du terreau dépendra de celle des feuilles. Je veux parler de la jeunesse française, en qui je mets tout mon espoir."
"I think of myself as a leaf that falls from the tree to make soil. The quality of the soil will depend on that of the leaves. I mean French youth, in whom I put all my hope."

Publications

Philisterburg (NRF, 1932).
Le Sage et le Caporal (Gallimard Collection blanche, 1930).
La Révolte, NRF, March 1934, republished in Comme je vous en donne l'exemple... and in Le Sage et le Capora, followed by Les Pères and seven other unpublished short stories" (Farrago, 2002).Les Pères, NRF, 1936, Farrago, Tours, 2002 (Le Sage et le Caporal followed by Les Pères and seven other unpublished short stories").
Comme je vous en donne l'exemple...  (Éditions Sociales, 1945, texts by Jacques Decour published by Aragon).
La Faune de la collaboration, Articles 1932-1942 (2012) (in French)

Translations

 Le Triomphe de la sensibilité, Goethe (1942)
 Les Mystères de la maturité, Hans Carossa (1941)
 L'Art gothique, Wilhelm Worringer (1941)
 La Carrière de Doris Hart, Vicki Baum, 1948.
 Les dessous de la diplomatie, Hans Rudolf Berndorff, 1932.
 Suivi de L’élaboration de la pensée par le discours, Heinrich von Kleist.
 Le Roman d’un coup d’État, Alfred Neumann, 1935.
 Les désordres sexuels, Richard Schauer, 1934.
 La Sexualité dans l’univers, Curt Thesing, 1933.
 Le fils d’Hannibal, Ludwig Ernst Wolff, 1938.

See also

Articles published in various magazines:
NRF, February 1930-December 1936,
Les Annales, March 1932-August 1933,
La Voix du peuple de Touraine, December 1936–June 1937,
Commune, December 1938–June 1939,
L'Université libre, November 1940–December 1941,
La Pensée libre, February 1941–February 1942.

References

 Jacques Decour, by Jean Paulhan (1943)
 Pages choisies de Jacques Decour, preface by Jean Paulhan, Comité national des écrivains, (20 February 1944)
 L’Allemagne vue par les écrivains de la Résistance française, Konrad Bieber, introduction by Albert Camus (1954)
 Anthologie des écrivains morts à la guerre (1939-1945), Association des écrivains combattants (1960)
 La Résistance et ses poètes : France, 1940-1945, Pierre Seghers (1974)
 Nos jeunes morts sont secrets. Littérature et résistance (2003) 
 La Guerre des cancres : un lycée au coeur de la Résistance et de la collaboration, Bertrand Matot (2010) 
 Les Germanistes français et l'Allemagne (1925-1949),  Roland Krebs, Sorbonne Université Presses (2020)

External links

List of publications
Le lycée Jacques-Decour during the Occupation

Communist members of the French Resistance
1910 births
1942 deaths
20th-century French non-fiction writers
Writers from Paris
Lycée Carnot alumni
Lycée Pasteur (Neuilly-sur-Seine) alumni
People executed by Nazi Germany by firing squad
Executed people from Île-de-France
French people executed by Nazi Germany
Resistance members killed by Nazi Germany
20th-century French male writers
20th-century pseudonymous writers
French Communist Party politicians
20th-century French translators
Translators from German